The 2009 Winton V8 Supercar Event was the third race meeting of the 2009 V8 Supercar Championship Series. It contained Races 5 and 6 of the series and was held on the weekend of May 1–3 at Winton Motor Raceway, near Benalla, in rural Victoria.

Rule change
The new race formats for 2009 saw two races to be held over the weekend, with a 100 kilometre race held as Race 5 on Saturday, with a 200 kilometre race held on Sunday as Race 6.

Race 5
Race 1 was held on Saturday May 2.

Race 6
Race 2 was held on Sunday May 3.

Results

Qualifying Race 5

Standings
 After Round 3 of 14

References

External links
Official series website
Official timing and results

Winton
May 2009 sports events in Australia